Protosphargis is an extinct genus of sea turtle from the Upper Cretaceous of Italy. It was first named by Capellini in 1884.

Sources
 Protosphargis at the Paleobiology Database
 The Journal of Geology'' By Thomas Chrowder Chamberlin, University of Chicago Dept. of Geology, University of Chicago Dept. of Geology and Paleontology. Page 726.

Dermochelyidae
Late Cretaceous turtles
Fossils of Italy
Prehistoric turtle genera
Extinct turtles